The Constitution of the Hashemite Kingdom of Jordan was adopted on 11 January 1952 and has been amended many times. It defines the hereditary monarchic rule with a parliamentary system of representation. It stipulates the separated powers of the state (executive, legislative and judicial), the citizens’ rights and duties, financial affairs and other constitutional regulations.

Background
An Organic Law was promulgated in April 1928 for use under the British mandate. After Jordan gained full independence in May 1946, following the abolition of the British Mandate, a new constitution was formulated,  published in the Official Gazette on 1 February 1947, and adopted by the Legislative Council on 28 November 1947. A few years later, the Constitution was liberalized by King Talal and ratified on 1 January 1952. It is generally regarded as liberal, although criticism may arise in regard to the great powers vested in the monarch.

Amendments 

The Jordanian constitution has undergone a series of amendments, including in 2011 and 2016. In 2021 a series of amendments was introduced, some of which led to a brawl in the parliament. These amendments were aiming to further women's rights and modernize Jordan.

See also
Line of succession to the Jordanian throne
Hussein of Jordan

References

External links
English translation of the Jordanian Constitution

Government of Jordan
Politics of Jordan
Law of Jordan
Jordan